Elevator Action EX is an update to the Game Boy version of Elevator Action published by Altron in 2000. In addition to colour, players can choose between three characters: Mike, an all rounded character, Guy, a slower yet more durable character, and Sarah, a faster yet weaker character.

This game was redesigned and published by BAM! Entertainment as Dexter's Laboratory: Robot Rampage, which uses Dexter's Laboratory characters.

Gameplay
The game contains four stages with four buildings each. At the end of 4th building in each stage, player fights against a series of enemies appearing from the doors inside a narrow tunnel, except for stage 4, where player fights against boss in a multi-level suite.

After completing the game, a password is given, which allows player to use the boss character (D.D.Fox) in the game. When playing as D.D.Fox, the final boss is Mike.

Plot

Reception

External links
Altron game info page
Moby Games info page
Total Makeover: Same Game, Different Name from 1UP.com shows changes to the game

2000 video games
Action video games
Altron games
Works set in elevators
Game Boy Color games
Video games featuring female protagonists
Game Boy Color-only games
Video games developed in Japan
TDK Mediactive games
Taito games
Single-player video games